Muğanlı or Mughanly or Mughanli or Mughanlu or Moughanly may refer to:

Muğanlı, Agdam, Azerbaijan
Muğanlı, Aghjabadi, Azerbaijan
Muğanlı, Agstafa, Azerbaijan
Muğanlı, Barda, Azerbaijan
Muğanlı, Khojavend, Azerbaijan
Muğanlı, Kurdamir, Azerbaijan
Muğanlı, Nakhchivan, Azerbaijan
Muğanlı, Qubadli, Azerbaijan
Muğanlı, Shamakhi, Azerbaijan
Muğanlı, Zangilan (disambiguation)
İkinci Muğanlı, Zangilan, Azerbaijan
Birinci Muğanlı, Zangilan, Azerbaijan
Muğanlı, Zaqatala, Azerbaijan

See also
Muğan (disambiguation)